Levent Tuncat (born 29 July 1988 in Duisburg, North Rhine-Westphalia) is a German taekwondo practitioner of Turkish descent. He won three gold medals for the 54 and 58 kg classes at the European Taekwondo Championships (2005 in Riga, Latvia, 2006 in Bonn, Germany, and 2008 in Rome, Italy).

Tuncat qualified for the men's 58 kg class at the 2008 Summer Olympics in Beijing, after placing second from the World Qualification Tournament in Manchester, England. He lost in the preliminary round of sixteen match to Afghanistan's Rohullah Nikpai, with a sudden death score of 3–4.

References

External links
  
 
 
 
 
 
 

1988 births
Living people
German male taekwondo practitioners
Olympic taekwondo practitioners of Germany
Taekwondo practitioners at the 2008 Summer Olympics
Taekwondo practitioners at the 2016 Summer Olympics
European Taekwondo Championships medalists
European Games medalists in taekwondo
European Games bronze medalists for Germany
Taekwondo practitioners at the 2015 European Games
German people of Turkish descent
Sportspeople from Duisburg